A stroopwafel (literally 'syrup waffle') is a thin, round waffle cookie made from two layers of sweet baked dough held together by caramel filling. First made in the city of Gouda, South Holland, Netherlands, stroopwafels are a well-known Dutch treat popular throughout the Netherlands and the former Dutch Empire, and exported abroad.

Description 
A stroopwafel's wafer layers are made from a stiff dough of flour, butter, brown sugar, yeast, milk, and eggs that has been pressed in a hot waffle iron until crisped. While still warm, the waffles have their edges removed with a cookie cutter, which allows the remaining disc to be easily separated into top and bottom wafers. A caramel filling made from syrup, brown sugar, butter, and cinnamon—also warm—is spread between the wafers before the waffle is reassembled. The caramel sets as it cools, thereby binding the waffle halves together.

English name 
The name stroopwafel is pure Dutch. In the English-speaking world, the treat may be known by some other names, like the literal translation "syrup waffle" or the less-literal "caramel waffle". Some Australian coffee houses may call them "coffee toppers", in reference to the practice of placing them atop hot beverages to soften the caramel and heat the cookie.

History
According to Dutch culinary folklore, stroopwafels were first made in Gouda either during the late 18th century or the early 19th century by bakers repurposing scraps and crumbs by sweetening them with syrup. One story ascribes the invention of the stroopwafel to the baker Gerard Kamphuisen, which would date the first stroopwafels from somewhere between 1810, the year he opened his bakery, and 1840, the year of the oldest known recipe for syrup waffles. Stroopwafels were not found outside Gouda until 1870, by which point the city was home to around 100 syrup-waffle bakers.

After 1870 stroopwafels began to appear in other cities, and in the 20th century, factory-made stroopwafels were introduced. By 1960, there were 17 factories in Gouda alone, of which four are still open. Today, stroopwafels are sold at markets, by street vendors, and in supermarkets, and since 2016 United Airlines has been serving Daelmans Stroopwafels as a breakfast snack on its domestic flights.

Variants 
Cookies similar to the stroopwafel may be found in parts of the Netherlands. Crumbs of stroopwafels (trimmings from manufacturing) are also sold in candy cones.

A thin wafer with a sugar filling is widely known in northern France, particularly in Lille. This local waffle is known as the gaufre fourrée lilloise, which consists of two thin wafer waffles filled with cassonade sugar and vanilla. A recipe for such a waffle with vanilla filling first appeared in 1849, in the workshop of the renowned patisserie, Maison Méert, from Lille. Waffles with a filling date back to the Middle Ages, as the famous guidebook for married women, Le Ménagier de Paris, compiled in 1393, already includes recipes of waffles with a cheese filling.

Gallery

Popular culture
In a September 2017 episode of the Great British Bake Off, the contestants had to make stroopwafels, but most failed in what some called the worst technical challenge in the show's history.

See also
 Freska – an Egyptian wafer with honey syrup filling

Notes and references

Notes

References

External links

 Association of Stroopwafel Addicts at Meta-Wiki

1784 introductions
Cookies
Dutch confectionery
Gouda, South Holland
Waffles
Dutch cuisine